Sphaeropteris rosenstockii is a species of tree fern in the family Cyatheaceae, native to New Guinea. It was first described by Guido Brause in 1920 as Cyathea rosenstockii, and transferred to Sphaeropteris by Rolla Tryon in 1970.

References

rosenstockii
Endemic flora of New Guinea
Plants described in 1920